The MASI index (Moroccan All Shares Index) is a stock index that tracks the performance of all companies listed in the Casablanca Stock Exchange located at Casablanca, Morocco.  It is one of the two main indexes at the stock exchange, the other being the MADEX (Moroccan Most Active Shares Index).

External links
Bloomberg page for MOSENEW:IND
Casablanca Stock Exchange official site

Casablanca Stock Exchange
African stock market indices
Economy of Morocco